Stephen Dorsey may refer to:

 Stephen Wallace Dorsey (1842–1916), United States Senator from Arkansas
 Stephen Bernard Dorsey (born 1937), Canadian entrepreneur